An Edge Emitting LED (ELED) fulfills the requirement of high brightness LED, which provides high efficiency coupling to optical fibers.

History
After the evolution of laser in 1960, implementation of LED in the optical communication systems could take place in 1970. Edge emitters were evolved in the mid-1970s.

Structure
The structure is seemingly similar to that of the injection laser diode. Their structure consists of an optical waveguide region, which acts as a guide for the light emitted along the waveguide by total internal reflection.
The structure of this type of led makes use of a structure of a modified injection laser. It also possesses a high active region, with a sufficient difference, such that the waveguide around the active area channels radiation to the emitting face of the devices.

Material used
Circular shaped active area present in the middle of the active layer is formed by GaAs. The length of the active region range from 100 to 150 μm. optical confinement or light guiding layers are formed by AlGaAs. The other materials used are AlGaAsSb/GaSb and InGaAsP/InP alloy.

Working
The feedback mechanism is suppressed to prevent the device to go to a saturated emission mode. At the heterojunction (extrinsic semiconductor layers used as interfaces between two homojunction materials), the guiding principle for optical power is total internal reflection, which guides the power out at the emitting facet of LED via path which is parallel to the junction. The core region of the wave guide guides the light. Core layer have more refractive index than that of the cladding in this case. At the boundaries of core region and the upper and lower boundaries of cladding layers, total internal reflection occurs. When provided with forward biasing using a DC source, recombination of electrons and holes at the thin n-AlGaAs would occur. At the edge of the active layer few photons would escape. Voltage current characteristic curve represents that beyond the threshold biasing voltage, current increases exponentially. Small incident angle photons will be guided by the wave-guide. The intensity of the light emitted is linearly proportional to the length of the wave guide. Emitted beam is half the power and in 30 degree plane of the junction.

Coupling sensitivity
An ELED when coupled to a single-mode fiber would display an improved coupling sensitivity to fiber displacement compared with multi mode fiber.  Sensitivity to lateral misalignment in the acute direction to the junction plane of the LED rises by at least a factor of three, regardless of the coupling scheme used.  A reciprocal relationship between peak coupling efficiency and sensitivity to misalignment could also be observed.

Other variants

Superradiant LED
They are the hybrids between LED and LASER . They possess internal optical gain, and have a high power density. The power spectra is 1-2% of the central wavelength. 
Used in optic gyroscopes.

Superluminicent LED
SLED emissions are broad band and of high intensity in nature. They are suitable for use with single mode fibers. These find their application in optical components for analysis.

Advantages
Reduced self-absorption in active layers because of transparent guiding layer with a thin active layer.
With small beam divergence, launch of more optical power into given fiber.
Higher data rates of more than 20 Mbit/s.

Advantages over Surface Emitters LED
More directional emission pattern
Better modulation bandwidth
High coupling efficiency with the usage of lens coupling
5 to 6 times more optical power could be coupled into numerical aperture of step and graded index fibers.

Disadvantages
Complicated structure
Difficulty in heat sink
Issues to handle mechanically
Expensive

References

Light-emitting diodes